Statistics of 1. deild in the 1993 season.

Overview
It was contested by 10 teams, and GÍ Gøta won the championship.

League standings

Results
The schedule consisted of a total of 18 games. Each team played two games against every opponent in no particular order. One of the games was at home and one was away.

Top goalscorers
Source: faroesoccer.com

11 goals
 Uni Arge (HB)

8 goals
 Torbjørn Jensen (B71)

7 goals
 Súni Fríði Barbá (B68)
 Øssur Hansen (B68)
 Henning Jarnskor (GÍ)

6 goals
 Kári Gullfoss (B36)
 Gunnar Mohr (HB)
 Sámal Joensen (GÍ)
 Pól Thorsteinsson (B36)

1. deild seasons
Faroe
Faroe
1